WWKA (92.3 MHz "K92-3") is a commercial FM radio station in Orlando, Florida. The station is owned by Cox Radio and has a country music radio format.  The studios and offices are located in Orlando on North John Young Parkway (Route 423).

The transmitter tower is in Bithlo, off Fort Christmas Road (Route 420).  The station has an effective radiated power of 100,000 watts with beam tilt.  It covers much of Central Florida from Daytona Beach to Palm Bay to Lakeland.  WWKA broadcasts in the HD radio format.

History

WDBO-FM
The station signed on in 1949 as WDBO-FM.  It was a sister station to AM station WDBO and was owned by the Orlando Broadcasting Company. The two stations simulcast and were affiliates of the CBS Radio Network, airing its schedule of dramas, comedies, news, sports, soap operas and game shows during the "Golden Age of Radio."  An advertisement in the 1950 edition of Broadcasting Yearbook said that in the competitive Orlando radio market, WDBO-AM-FM had "more listeners than the next three network stations combined."

In July 1954, the Orlando Broadcasting Company added WDBO-TV.  As network programming was moving to television, WDBO-AM-FM shifted to a local full service middle of the road format of music, news, sports and talk.

In the late 1960s, the simulcast ended and WDBO-FM switched to an easy listening format, which the Orlando Broadcasting Company described as "good music."

Country music WWKA

When Katz Broadcasting bought the radio stations in 1982, WDBO-FM switched to country music, and changed its call letters to WWKA, using the moniker "K92FM." (The WDBO-FM call sign would return to the Orlando market in 2011 on 96.5 MHz.) WDBO-TV changed its call letters to WCPX, and is now WKMG-TV, owned by the Graham Media Group.

There was some initial resistance to the country music format.  Three broadcasters locked themselves in the studio on December 21, 1982, in protest. The situation was resolved peacefully within a few hours.

Ownership changes

In August 1986, WWKA and WDBO were sold to the Newhouse Corporation.  Newhouse increased WDBO's talk programming and eventually stopped playing music on AM 580, but continued WWKA's country format.

WWKA and WDBO were acquired by Cox Communications in 1997.  Cox already owned ABC TV-affiliate WFTV.  In 2012, WWKA tweaked its branding, dropping the ‘FM’ from its brand name.

References

External links
WWKA official website

WKA
Country radio stations in the United States
Cox Media Group
Radio stations established in 1952
1952 establishments in Florida